Guinga (Carlos Althier de Souza Lemos Escobar; born June 10, 1950) is a Brazilian guitarist and composer born in Madureira, a working-class suburb of Rio de Janeiro. As a child, he was nicknamed "Gringo", because of his pale skin, and the artistic name "Guinga" comes from the way he pronounced the word.

Biography 
His uncle taught him to play the guitar when he was eleven years old.
Guinga began composing music at the age of 14. In 1967, when he was 17, his song "Sou Só Solidão" reached the first eliminatory round in Rede Globo's second Festival Internacional da Canção (International Festival of Song). At the age of 26, he began his five-year classical guitar studies with Jodacil Damasceno.

During the 1970s, Guinga accompanied famous singers such as Beth Carvalho and João Nogueira and recorded with samba legends Cartola and Clara Nunes. He also began a fertile songwriting partnership with the poet and lyricist Paulo Cesar Pinheiro. Their songs were recorded by important artists like Elis Regina, Nelson Gonçalves, Miúcha, Clara Nunes, and Michel Legrand.

During the same time, Guinga embarked on a parallel career in dentistry, which he practiced for nearly thirty years.
His music career took off in earnest in 1990, when Ivan Lins and Vitor Martins formed the Velas label in order to release Guinga's first album, with a repertoire of songs he co-authored with lyricist Aldir Blanc.

Guinga is known for his songwriting and his skill on the guitar. 
He is known for drawing on many musical genres, including choro, samba, baião, frevo, modinha, waltz, foxtrot, blues, classical music, and jazz. His compositions are often harmonically and rhythmically complex, while being melodic.

Discography
Albums
Simples e Absurdo (1991) Velas  
Delírio Carioca (1993) Velas
Cheio de Dedos (1996) Velas
Suíte Leopoldina (1999) Velas
Cine Baronesa (2001) Velas
A Música Brasileira deste Século por seus Autores e Intérpretes: Guinga (2002) Sesc
Noturno Copacabana (2003) Velas
Graffiando Vento - Guinga & Gabriele Mirabassi (2004) Egea
Dialetto Carioca (2007) Egea
Casa de Villa (2007) Biscoito Fino
Saudade do Cordão - Guinga & Paulo Sérgio Santos (2009) Biscoito Fino
Rasgando Seda - Guinga & Quinteto Villa-Lobos (2012) Sesc
Francis e Guinga - Guinga & Francis Hime (2013) Biscoito Fino

Contributing artist
 Bolero de Satá (Nina Ripe & Guinga) - Nina Ripe: Apaixonada (2011) (Nina Ripe Music)
 The Rough Guide to the Music of Brazil (1998) (World Music Network)

References

External links 
 Guinga's Website
 Guinga Discography, including all his tunes recorded by others
 Guinga Rising, an article about the composer's life and work by Daniella Thompson

Música Popular Brasileira guitarists
Brazilian composers
Brazilian male guitarists
1950 births
Living people
Musicians from Rio de Janeiro (city)